A shindig is a lively party; it may also refer to:

In media and entertainment
The Shindig, a 1930 Mickey Mouse cartoon
"Shindig", a 1963 instrumental by The Shadows
"Shindig" (Firefly), a television episode
Shindig!, a 1960s American music variety television show
Shindig!, a British monthly music magazine since 2015

Other
 Shindig, Kentucky, an unincorporated community in the United States
Shindig (software), a framework for web-based applications
Shindig (video chat platform)